Je (Ј ј; italics: Ј ј) is a letter of the Cyrillic script, taken over from the Latin letter J.

History
The Cyrillic letter ј was introduced in the 1818 Serbian dictionary of Vuk Stefanović Karadžić, on the basis of the Latin letter j. Karadžić had previously used ї instead for the same sound, a usage he took from Dositej Obradović, and the final choice also notably edged out another expected candidate, й, used in every other standard Slavic-language Cyrillic script.

Usage

Related letters and other similar characters
Е е : Cyrillic letter Ye
Й й : Cyrillic letter Short I
І і : Cyrillic letter Decimal I
Ҋ ҋ : Cyrillic letter Short I with tail
,  : Cyrillic letter Je with belt
J j : Latin letter J
Y y : Latin letter Y

Computing codes

External links

Notes